Puerto Rico Highway 6 (PR‑6) is a  long north‑south urban primary highway within the barrio of Juan Sánchez in the municipality of Bayamón, Puerto Rico, that serves as a by-pass route from Puerto Rico Highway 5 (PR‑5) to Puerto Rico Highway 2 (PR‑2). The entire route is also known as Calle San Jose (San Jose Street).

Route description
PR‑6 begins at a three-way junction with PR‑2 on the southern edge of the Villa España neighborhood, a gated and planned community in central Juan Sánchez. (PR‑2 heads east toward the municipality of Guaynabo and west thorough the northern part of Bayamon.) From its southern terminus, PR‑6 heads north-northwest as a divided four-lane road and almost immediately has an intersection with the west access road to Villa España. (Other than its termini, this is the only intersection along PR‑6.) From that intersection PR‑6 turns northwest to run along the western edge of Villa España, past its northern edge. Shortly thereafter, the route turns north-northeast and reaches its northern terminus at a trumpet interchange with PR‑5 (Expreso Rio Hondo [Rio Hondo Expressway]). (PR‑5 heads northeast toward San Juan and Carolina and southwest through Bayamon toward Aguas Buenas.)

Major intersections

See also

 List of highways numbered 6

References

External links

 

006
Bayamón, Puerto Rico